Dwars door West-Vlaanderen is a road bicycle race through the Belgian province of West Flanders.

History
The race was originally created unter the name Omloop der Vlaamse Ardennen (English: Tour of the Flemish Ardennes) in 1945 as a one-day race. It remained like that until 1999, when it became a two-day stage race and was renamed Guldensporentweedaagse. In 2003 it was extended to three days and became known as the Driedaagse van West-Vlaanderen (English: Three Days of West Flanders), and held on to this format until 2016. It was also known as the Johan Museeuw Classic. From 2006 to 2016 the race was organized as a 2.1 event on the UCI Europe Tour.

Since 2017 the race morphed into a one-day event again and was rebranded Dwars door West-Vlaanderen; initially as a 1.1 event of the UCI Europe Tour but with the aim of becoming a 1.HC event in the near future.

Winners

References

External links

  

 
Cycle races in Belgium
UCI Europe Tour races
Recurring sporting events established in 1945
1945 establishments in Belgium
Sport in West Flanders
2018 disestablishments in Belgium
Recurring sporting events disestablished in 2018
Defunct cycling races in Belgium